Sonnet 45 is one of 154 sonnets written by the English playwright and poet William Shakespeare. It is a member of the Fair Youth sequence, in which the poet expresses his love towards a young man. Sonnet 45 is continued from Sonnet 44.

Structure
Sonnet 45 is an English or Shakespearean sonnet. The Shakespearean sonnet contains three quatrains followed by a final rhyming couplet. It follows the form's typical rhyme scheme, ABAB CDCD EFEF GG, and is written in a type of poetic metre called iambic pentameter based on five pairs of metrically weak/strong syllabic positions. The final line exemplifies a regular iambic pentameter:

×  /     ×   /   × /    ×      /       ×   / 
I send them back again, and straight grow sad. (45.14)
/ = ictus, a metrically strong syllabic position. × = nonictus.

The meter demands several contractions: one-syllable "being" in line 7 and "even" in line 11, and — somewhat controversially — a three-syllable "melancholy" (probably pronounced mel-an-ch'ly) in line 8.

Recordings
Paul Kelly, for the 2016 album, Seven Sonnets & a Song

Notes

References

External links
Analysis

British poems
Sonnets by William Shakespeare